José María Alberto Inga Guerrero (born 7 October 1999) is a Peruvian footballer who plays as a midfielder for Peruvian Primera División side Carlos A. Mannucci on loan from Sporting Cristal.

Club career

Sporting Cristal
Inga is a product of Sporting Cristal which he arrived to in 2008 after having played in the academy of Alianza Lima. Playing regularly for the club's reserve team, 19-year old Inga was loaned out to fellow league club Ayacucho FC on 26 June 2019 for the rest of the year, to gain more playing experience on a higher level.

Returning from the loan spell, Inga got his official debut for Sporting Cristal in the first game of 2020 against UTC Cajamarca, playing all 90 minutes. In January 2021, Inga was loaned out again, this time to Universidad San Martín for the 2021 season.

On 24 November 2021 it was confirmed, that Inga would play on loan at Carlos A. Mannucci for the 2022 season.

References

External links
 
 

Living people
1999 births
Association football midfielders
Peruvian footballers
Peruvian Primera División players
Sporting Cristal footballers
Ayacucho FC footballers
Club Deportivo Universidad de San Martín de Porres players
Carlos A. Mannucci players